Yeylaq Rural District is a rural district (dehestan) in the Central District of Buin va Miandasht County, Isfahan Province, Iran. At the 2006 census, its population was 4,012, in 787 families.  The rural district has 12 villages.

References 

Rural Districts of Isfahan Province
Buin va Miandasht County